{{Speciesbox
| status = LC 
| status_system = IUCN3.1
| display_parents = 3
| genus = Enteromius
| species = toppini
| authority = Boulenger, 1916
| synonyms = 
Barbus umbeluziensis Groenewald, 1958'Barbus toppini Boulenger, 1916
|status_ref=
}}

The east coast barb (Enteromius toppini''''') is a species of cyprinid fish.

It is found in Kenya, Malawi, Tanzania, and Zimbabwe. Its natural habitat is rivers. It is not considered a threatened species by the IUCN.

References

Enteromius
Freshwater fish of Kenya
Freshwater fish of Tanzania
Cyprinid fish of Africa
Fish of Malawi
Fish described in 1916
Taxa named by George Albert Boulenger
Taxonomy articles created by Polbot